A compliment is an expression of praise, congratulation or encouragement.

Compliment or Compliments may refer to:

Music
 Compliments (album), an album by Jerry Garcia
 "Compliments" (Band of Horses song)
 "Compliments" (Bloc Party song)

Other uses
 Backhanded compliment, an insult disguised as a compliment
 Compliment, a formalized respectful action paid to a superior, such as saluting an officer in the armed forces
 Compliments slip, a small acknowledgement note, less formal than a letter
 Compliment, a typeface by Ludwig & Mayer

See also 
 Complement (disambiguation)
 Complimentary (disambiguation)